Taygun Kuru (born 8 January 1990) is a Turkish-German footballer who plays as a midfielder.

Kuru played as a youth for Preußen Berlin and 1. FC Nürnberg, before joining Bayern Munich in 2007. After two years in Bayern's youth setup, he was promoted to the reserve squad for the 2009–10 season. He made his debut on 1 September 2009, coming on as a substitute for Manuel Duhnke in a 3. Liga match against VfB Stuttgart II. He made a further seven appearances that season, but did not play at all during 2010–11 season, and was released by the club in June 2011, signing for SpVgg Greuther Fürth II shortly afterwards.

References

External links
 

1990 births
Living people
German people of Turkish descent
FC Bayern Munich II players
SpVgg Greuther Fürth players
Footballers from Berlin
3. Liga players
Association football midfielders
German footballers